Dumka is a city in Jharkhand, India.

Dumka may also refer to:

Dumka (musical genre)
Dumka district
Dumka (community development block)
Dumka (Vidhan Sabha constituency)
Dumka (Lok Sabha constituency)

See also